John William Money (8 July 1921 – 7 July 2006) was a New Zealand psychologist, sexologist and author known for his research into sexual identity and biology of gender. He was one of the first researchers to publish theories on the influence of societal constructs of gender on individual formation of gender identity. Money introduced the terms gender role and sexual orientation and popularised the terms gender identity and paraphilia.  

Working with endocrinologist Claude Migeon, Money established the Johns Hopkins Gender Identity Clinic, the first clinic in the United States to perform sexual reassignment surgeries on both infants and adults.  He spent a considerable amount of his career in the United States.

A 1997 academic study criticised Money's work in many respects, particularly in regard to the involuntary sex-reassignment of the child David Reimer, and Money's abuse of Reimer and his brother when they were children. Some of Money's "therapy" sessions involved Money forcing the two children to perform sexual activities with each other, which Money then photographed, "for research". David Reimer lived a troubled life, eventually committing suicide at 38; his brother died of an overdose at age 36.

Money's writing has been translated into many languages and includes around 2,000 articles, books, chapters and reviews. He received around 65 honours, awards and degrees in his lifetime.
He was also a patron of many famous New Zealand artists, such as Rita Angus and Theo Schoon.

Biography
Money was born in Morrinsville, New Zealand, to a Protestant family of English and Welsh descent. He attended Hutt Valley High School and initially studied psychology at Victoria University of Wellington, graduating with a double master's degree in psychology and education in 1944. He was a junior member of the psychology faculty at the University of Otago in Dunedin. 

In 1947, at the age of 26, Money emigrated to the United States to study at the Psychiatric Institute of the University of Pittsburgh. He left Pittsburgh and earned his PhD from Harvard University in 1952. 

Money proposed and developed several theories and related terminology, including gender identity, gender role, gender-identity/role and lovemap. He popularised the term paraphilia (appearing in the DSM-III, which would later replace perversions) and introduced the term sexual orientation in place of sexual preference, arguing that attraction is not necessarily a matter of free choice.

Money was a professor of paediatrics and medical psychology at Johns Hopkins University from 1951 until his death. In 1960 and 1961, he co-authored two papers with Richard Green, "Incongruous Gender Role: Nongenital Manifestations in Prepubertal Boys" and "Effeminacy in Prepubertal Boys: Summary of Eleven Cases and Recommendations for Case Management."

Money established the Johns Hopkins Gender Identity Clinic in 1965 along with Claude Migeon who was the head of paediatric endocrinology at Johns Hopkins. The hospital began performing sexual reassignment surgery in 1966, and was the first clinic in the United States to do so. At Johns Hopkins, Money was also involved with the Sexual Behaviors Unit, which ran studies on sex-reassignment surgery.
In 2002 he received the Magnus Hirschfeld Medal from the German Society for Social-Scientific Sexuality Research.

Money was also an early supporter of New Zealand's arts, both literary and visual. In 2002, as his Parkinson's disease worsened, Money donated a substantial portion of his art collection to the Eastern Southland Art Gallery in Gore, New Zealand. In 2003, the New Zealand Prime Minister, Helen Clark, opened the John Money wing at the Eastern Southland Gallery.

Money died 7 July 2006, one day before his 85th birthday, in Towson, Maryland, of complications from Parkinson's disease.

Books on sexology

Money co-edited a 1969 book Transsexualism and Sex Reassignment, which helped bring more acceptance to sexual reassignment surgery and transsexual individuals.

Money introduced numerous definitions related to gender in journal articles in the 1950s, many of them as a result of his studies of intersex morphology. His definition of gender is based on his understanding of sex differences among human beings. According to Money, the fact that one sex produces ova and the other sex produces sperm is the irreducible criterion of sex difference. However, there are other sex-derivative differences that follow in the wake of this primary dichotomy. These differences involve the way urine is expelled from the human body and other questions of sexual dimorphism. According to Money's theory, sex-adjunctive differences are typified by the smaller size of females and their problems in moving around while nursing infants. This then makes it more likely that the males do the roaming and hunting.

Sex-arbitrary differences are those that are purely conventional: for example, colour selection (baby blue for boys, pink for girls). Some of the latter differences apply to life activities, such as career opportunities for men versus women. Finally, Money created the now-common term gender role which he differentiated from the concept of the more traditional terminology sex role. This grew out of his studies of intersex people. According to Money, the genitalia and erotic sexual roles were now, by his definition, to be included under the more general term "gender role" including all the non-genital and non-erotic activities that are defined by the conventions of society to apply to males or to females.

In his studies of intersex people, Money alleged that there are six variables that define sex. While in the average person all six would line up unequivocally as either all "male" or "female", in hermaphrodites any one or more than one of these could be inconsistent with the others, leading to various kinds of anomalies. In his seminal 1955 paper he defined these factors as:
 assigned sex and sex of rearing
 external genital morphology
 internal reproductive structures
 hormonal and secondary sex characteristics
 gonadal sex
 chromosomal sex

and added, 

He then defined gender role as; 

Money made the concept of gender a broader, more inclusive concept than one of masculine/feminine. For him, gender included not only one's status as a man or a woman, but was also a matter of personal recognition, social assignment, or legal determination; not only on the basis of one's genitalia but also on the basis of somatic and behavioural criteria that go beyond genital differences. In 1972, Money presented his theories in Man and Woman, Boy and Girl, a college level textbook. The book featured David Reimer as an example of gender reassignment.

In his book Gay, Straight and In-Between: The Sexology of Erotic Orientation, Money develops a conception of "bodymind". "Bodymind" is a way for scientists, in developing a science about sexuality, to move on from the platitudes of dichotomy between nature versus nurture, innate versus the acquired, biological versus the social, and psychological versus the physiological. He suggested that all of these capitalise on the ancient, pre-Platonic, pre-biblical conception of body versus the mind, and the physical versus the spiritual. In coining the term "bodymind", in this sense, Money wishes to move beyond these very ingrained principles of our folk or vernacular psychology.

Money also developed a view of "Concepts of Determinism" which, transcultural, transhistorical, and universal, all people have in common, sexologically or otherwise. These include pairbondage, troopbondage, abidance, ycleptance, foredoomance, with these coping strategies: adhibition (engagement), inhibition, explication. Money suggested that the concept of "threshold" – the release or inhibition of sexual (or other) behavior – is most useful for sex research as a substitute for any concept of motivation. Moreover, it confers the distinct advantage of having continuity and unity to what would otherwise be a highly disparate and varied field of research. It also allows for the classification of sexual behavior. For Money, the concept of threshold has great value because of the wide spectrum to which it applies. "It allows one to think developmentally or longitudinally, in terms of stages or experiences that are programmed serially, or hierarchically, or cybernetically (i.e. regulated by mutual feedback)."

Controversies

Institutionalization of Janet Frame

Author Janet Frame attended some of Money's classes at the University of Otago, as part of her teacher's training. Frame was attracted to Money, and eager to please him. In October 1945, after Frame wrote an essay mentioning her thoughts of suicide, John Money convinced Frame to enter the psychiatric ward at Dunedin Public Hospital, where she was misdiagnosed as suffering from schizophrenia. Frame then spent eight years in psychiatric institutions, during which she was subjected to electroshock and insulin shock therapy. Frame narrowly missed being lobotomized. In Frame's autobiography, An Angel at My Table, Money is referred to as John Forrest.

Sex reassignment of David Reimer

During his professional life, Money was respected as an expert on sexual behavior, especially known for his views that gender was learned rather than innate. However, it was later revealed that his most famous case of David Reimer, born Bruce Reimer, was fundamentally flawed. In 1966, a botched circumcision left eight-month-old Reimer without a penis. Money persuaded the baby's parents that sex reassignment surgery would be in Reimer's best interest. At the age of 22 months, Reimer underwent an orchiectomy, in which his testicles were surgically removed. He was reassigned to be raised as female and his name changed from Bruce to Brenda. Money further recommended hormone treatment, to which the parents agreed. Money then recommended a surgical procedure to create an artificial vagina, which the parents refused. Money published a number of papers reporting the reassignment as successful.

According to John Colapinto's biography of David Reimer, starting when Reimer and his twin Brian were six years old, Money showed the brothers pornography and forced the two to rehearse sexual acts. Money would order David to get down on all fours and Brian was forced to "come up behind [him] and place his crotch against [his] buttocks". Money also forced Reimer, in another sexual position, to have his "legs spread" with Brian on top. On "at least one occasion" Money took a photograph of the two children performing these acts.

When either child resisted Money, Money would get angry. Both Reimer and Brian recall that Money was mild-mannered around their parents, but ill-tempered when alone with them. Money also forced the two children to strip for "genital inspections"; when they resisted inspecting each other's genitals, Money got very aggressive. Reimer says, "He told me to take my clothes off, and I just did not do it. I just stood there. And he screamed, 'Now!' Louder than that. I thought he was going to give me a whupping. So I took my clothes off and stood there shaking."

Money's rationale for his treatment of the children was his belief that "childhood 'sexual rehearsal play "at thrusting movements and copulation" was important for a "healthy adult gender identity".

Both Reimer and Brian were traumatized by the "therapy"," with Brian speaking about it "only with the greatest emotional turmoil", and David unwilling to speak about the details publicly. At 14 years old and in extreme psychological agony, David Reimer was finally told the truth by his parents. He chose to begin calling himself David, and he underwent surgical procedures to revert the female bodily modifications.   

Despite the pain and turmoil of the brothers, for decades, Money reported on Reimer's progress as the "John/Joan case", describing apparently successful female gender development and using this case to support the feasibility of sex reassignment and surgical reconstruction even in non-intersex cases. 

By the time this deception was discovered, the idea of a purely socially constructed gender identity and infant Intersex medical interventions had become the accepted medical and sociological standard.

David Reimer's case came to international attention in 1997 when he told his story to Milton Diamond, an academic sexologist, who persuaded Reimer to allow him to report the outcome in order to dissuade physicians from treating other infants similarly. Soon after, Reimer went public with his story, and John Colapinto published a widely disseminated and influential account in Rolling Stone magazine in December 1997. This was later expanded into The New York Times best-selling biography As Nature Made Him: The Boy Who Was Raised as a Girl (2000), in which Colapinto described how—contrary to Money's reports—when living as Brenda, Reimer did not identify as a girl. He was ostracised and bullied by peers (who dubbed him "cavewoman"), and neither frilly dresses nor female hormones made him feel female.

In July 2002, Brian was found dead from an overdose of antidepressants. In May 2004, David committed suicide by shooting himself in the head with a sawed-off shotgun at the age of 38. According to his mother, "he had recently become depressed after losing his job and separating from his wife." Reimer's parents have stated that Money's methodology was responsible for the deaths of both of their sons.

Money argued that media response to Diamond's exposé was due to right-wing media bias and "the antifeminist movement." He said his detractors believed "masculinity and femininity are built into the genes so women should get back to the mattress and the kitchen". However, intersex activists also criticised Money, stating that the unreported failure had led to the surgical reassignment of thousands of infants as a matter of policy. Privately, Money was mortified by the case, colleagues said, and as a rule did not discuss it.

Researcher Mary Anne Case wrote that Money made "fraudulently deceptive claims about the malleability of gender in certain patients who had involuntarily undergone sex reassignment surgery" and that this fueled the anti-gender movement.

Opinions on paedophilia
Money participated in debates on chronophilias, especially paedophilia. He stated that both sexual researchers and the public do not make distinctions between affectional paedophilia and sadistic paedophilia. Colapinto reported that, according to a right-wing group critical of his teachings, Money told Paidika, a Dutch journal, of pedophilia:

Money held the view that affectional paedophilia is caused by a surplus of parental love that became erotic, and is not a behavioural disorder. Rather, he took the position that heterosexuality is another example of a societal and therefore superficial, ideological concept.

Works
Money, John. (1952). Hermaphroditism: An Inquiry into the Nature of a Human Paradox. Thesis (Ph.D.), Harvard University.
Money, John, and Patricia Tucker. (1975). Sexual Signatures on Being a Man or a Woman. Little Brown & Co: 
Money, John. (1985). The Destroying Angel. Prometheus. 
Money, John. (1986). Venuses Penuses. Prometheus. 
Money, John. (1986). Lovemaps: Clinical Concepts of Sexual/Erotic Health and Pathology, Paraphilia, and Gender Transposition in Childhood, Adolescence, and Maturity. New York: Irvington. 
Money, John. (1988) Gay, Straight, and In-Between: The Sexology of Erotic Orientation. New York: Oxford University Press. 
Money, John. (1989). Vandalized Lovemaps: Paraphilic Outcome of 7 Cases in Pediatric Sexology. Prometheus Books: 
Money, John. (1994). Sex Errors of the Body and Related Syndromes: A Guide to Counseling Children, Adolescents, and Their Families , 2nd ed. Baltimore: P.H. Brooks Publishing Company. 
Money, John. (1995). Gendermaps: Social Constructionism, Feminism, and Sexosophical History. New York: Continuum. 
Money, John, and Anke Ehrhardt. (1996). Man & Woman, Boy & Girl: Gender Identity from Conception to Maturity. Northvale, N.J.: Jason Aronson. Originally published: 1972 
Money, John. (1999). The Lovemap Guidebook: A Definitive Statement. Continuum.

See also
Comprachicos
Intersexion – the impact of Money's theories on the treatment of intersex people is featured in this documentary
 Robert Stoller

References

Further reading
Ehrhardt, Anke A. 'John Money, PhD' Journal of Sex Research 44.3 (2007): 223–224.

External links

John Money Collection via the Kinsey Institute
Review of John Colapinto's book on John Money and David Reimer from "The Weekly Standard"
 Joanne Silberner, The Legacy of Sex Researcher John Money, NPR

1921 births
2006 deaths
20th-century New Zealand medical doctors
American sexologists
Neurological disease deaths in Maryland
Deaths from Parkinson's disease
Harvard University alumni
Intersex and medicine
Johns Hopkins University faculty
New Zealand art collectors
New Zealand people of Welsh descent
New Zealand people of English descent
New Zealand psychiatrists
New Zealand scientists
People from Morrinsville
People involved in scientific misconduct incidents
Transgender studies academics
University of Pittsburgh alumni
Academic staff of the University of Otago
Victoria University of Wellington alumni
People educated at Hutt Valley High School